Malumichampatti (also known as Malumachampatti) is a residential village in the Coimbatore-South taluk, Coimbatore district, Tamil Nadu, India. It is along the National Highway 209. It is a village panchayat and belongs to Kinathukadavu Legislative constituency.

Geography
It has an average elevation of 381 m (1250 ft).

Demography
The population of the village according to the 2011 census of India is 12,936 with male population of 6568 and female population of 6368. The literacy rate of the village is 86.09%.

References

Cities and towns in Coimbatore district